Kot Rajput is a town located in the Punjab province of Pakistan. It is located in Lahore District at 31°9'0N 73°13'0E with an altitude of 173 metres (570 feet). Neighbouring settlements include Kutruwal and Bhagthal.

References

Populated places in Lahore District
History of Pakistan